Baverd (also Romanized as Bāverd and Bāvard; also known as Bavar, and Būr) is a village in Howmeh Rural District, in the Central District of Bandar Lengeh County, Hormozgan Province, Iran. At the 2006 census, its population was 1,077, in 223 families.

References 

Populated places in Bandar Lengeh County